Sapudi Islands are a group of 14 islands that lie between Madura Island and the Kangean islands of Indonesia. It is part of the Greater Sunda Islands and is located in the Java Sea. The Sapudi Islands are administered as three kabupaten (districts) of Sumenep Regency in the province of East Java. The land area is 167.38 km2, and there was a population of 82,024 at the 2010 Census and 85,284 at the 2020 Census. The Madurese language is spoken on the islands.

Nonggunong District includes the northern half of Sapudi Island (Pulau Sapedi) and the small offshore islands of Manok and Payangan, Gayam District includes the southern half of Sapudi Island, and Raas District comprises 11 islands further east. The main settlement on Sapudi Island (Nonggunong District) is Sonok, while on the eastern islands of Raas District, settlements are Ketupat and Brakas.

References

Archipelagoes of Indonesia
Geography of East Java